John Conard (November 15, 1773May 9, 1857) was a member of the U.S. House of Representatives from Pennsylvania.  He was nicknamed the "Fighting Quaker".

John Conard was born in Chester Valley in the Province of Pennsylvania.  He was educated at the Friends School.  He moved to Germantown, Pennsylvania about 1795.  He studied law, was admitted to the bar and practiced.  He was a professor of mathematics at the local academy in Germantown.

Conard was elected as a Democratic-Republican to the Thirteenth Congress.  He declined to be a candidate for renomination in 1814.  He was the associate judge of the district court.  He was appointed United States marshal for the United States District Court for the Eastern District of Pennsylvania by President James Monroe.  He was reappointed by President John Quincy Adams and served two years under President Andrew Jackson.  He retired from public life in 1832, and moved to Maryland about 1834 and settled in Cecil County near Port Deposit, where he lived until 1851, when he moved to Philadelphia.  He died in Philadelphia in 1857.  Interment in St. Mary Anne's Episcopal Churchyard in North East, Maryland.

Sources

The Political Graveyard

American Quakers
1773 births
1857 deaths
United States Marshals
Democratic-Republican Party members of the United States House of Representatives from Pennsylvania
Politicians from Philadelphia
People from Port Deposit, Maryland